William Hawkins may refer to:

William Hawkins (died c. 1554), MP for Plymouth
William Hawkins (died 1589), English sea-captain and merchant
William Hawkins (fl. c. 1600), 16th century representative of the English East India Company
William Hawkins (serjeant-at-law) (1673–1746), English serjeant-at-law and legal writer
William Hawkins (priest) (1722–1801), English poet and dramatist, son of the serjeant-at-law
William Hawkins (governor) (1777–1819), governor of North Carolina
William L. Hawkins (1895-1990), African-American folk artist
Bill Hawkins (cricketer) (1861–1930), New Zealand cricketer and Member of Parliament
William Ashbie Hawkins (1862–1941), African American lawyer in Baltimore
William D. Hawkins (1914–1943), American Marine awarded the Medal of Honor during World War II
William E. Hawkins (1863–1937), Justice of the Supreme Court of Texas
William Hawkins (songwriter and poet) (1940–2016), Canadian songwriter, musician and poet
Trip Hawkins (born 1953), founder of Electronic Arts
Bill Hawkins (American football) (born 1966), player for the Los Angeles Rams
Yisrayl Hawkins (born Buffalo Bill Hawkins), 20th century religious leader
William A. Hawkins (born 1954), CEO of Medtronic, a medical company in Minnesota
William Warwick Hawkins, British Member of Parliament for Colchester